This article contains three lists: songs of the socialist parties and movements, anthems of self-proclaimed socialist states, and musical movements that feature prominent socialist themes. Not all national anthems of socialist states are necessarily explicitly socialist, and many were in use at other time in a nation's history.

Songs of socialist movements

National anthems of socialist states and territories

Musical movements influenced by socialism
 Nueva canción
 Nueva trova
 Nueva canción Chilena
 Nova cançó
 Music of the Chinese Cultural Revolution
 Political hip-hop
 Protest songs
 Punk
 Trade union songs

See also

 Little Red Songbook
 Mass song
 Music and politics
 Music of the Soviet Union
 People's Songs
 Red Army Choir
 Revolutionary song

References

Lists of musical works
Songs
Political songs
Propaganda songs
Propaganda by topic